Peter Cuong Franklin is a Vietnamese American chef and founder of Anan Saigon in Ho Chi Minh City, Vietnam, and Chôm Chôm in Hong Kong, specializing in "Cuisine Mới" (new Vietnamese cuisine).  Born in Da Lat, Vietnam, Franklin fled Ho Chi Minh City as a child refugee on April 29, 1975 during the Fall of Saigon. He was later adopted by an American family, attending Fairfield College Preparatory School and Yale University.

Career 

Franklin worked at Morgan Stanley as an investment banker prior to enrolling at Le Cordon Bleu in 2008. He trained as a chef at Nahm in Bangkok, Caprice in Hong Kong, and Next and Alinea in Chicago. Franklin opened Chôm Chôm in Hong Kong's SoHo district in 2011. In 2017, Franklin opened Anan Saigon, a modern Vietnamese restaurant located in a tube house in Ho Chi Minh City's old market (Chợ Cu). Anan was the first restaurant in Ho Chi Minh City to be awarded Asia's 50 Best Restaurants in 2021.

Restaurants 
Active Restaurants

 Anan Saigon
 Nhau Nhau
 Chôm Chôm

Closed Restaurants

 Viet Kitchen

References 

Alumni of Le Cordon Bleu
Yale University alumni
Living people
People from Da Lat
American chefs
American male chefs
Year of birth missing (living people)